Julia Görges was the defending champion, but chose to compete in Luxembourg instead.

Daria Kasatkina won the title, defeating Ons Jabeur in the final, 2–6, 7–6(7–3), 6–4.

Jabeur became the first player representing Tunisia to reach a WTA final. With her win over Jabeur, Kasatkina broke inside the top 10 world ranking for the first time in her career, and qualified for the 2018 WTA Finals as the first alternate, replacing Aryna Sabalenka.

Seeds
The top four seeds received a bye into the second round.

Draw

Finals

Top half

Bottom half

Qualifying

Seeds

Qualifiers

Lucky losers

Draw

First qualifier

Second qualifier

Third qualifier

Fourth qualifier

References

External links
 Main Draw
 Qualifying Draw

Kremlin Cup - Singles
2018 Women's Singles
2018 in Russian women's sport